KACD-LP (94.1 FM) is a low-power FM radio station licensed to Midland, Texas, United States, serving the Odessa-Midland area. The station is currently owned by Helping Others Prepare for Empowerment (HOPE). The station went silent on May 26, 2020.

References

External links
 

ACD-LP
ACD-LP
ACD-LP
Radio stations established in 2004
2004 establishments in Texas